Paband may refer to:
 Paband, Hormozgan
 Paband-e Genow, Hormozgan Province
 Paband, Mazandaran
 Paband, Zanjan